Flushdyke was a Great Northern Railway station on Wakefield Road in Flushdyke, West Yorkshire. The station originally opened (as Ossett) on the north side of Wakefield Road on 7 April 1862, was renamed Flushdyke when the later Ossett station opened two years later, and at some date moved to the south side of the road bridge. It was closed from 5 May 1941. Steps from the road led to two side platforms, each with a shelter.

References

External links 

Rail transport in Yorkshire
Former Great Northern Railway stations
Railway stations opened in 1867
Railway stations closed in 1941
Railway stations in Great Britain opened in the 19th century